HomeStreet, Inc., d.b.a HomeStreet Bank, together with its subsidiaries, provides various financial services primarily in Washington, Oregon, California, and Hawaii. The company was founded as Continental Mortgage and Loan Company in 1921 by W. Walter Williams. It changed its name to Continental Savings Bank in 1986. In May 2000, the named changed to HomeStreet Bank.  Its current headquarters are in Seattle, Washington.

Following the financial crisis of 2007–2008 the bank suffered heavy losses. In 2012, in order to satisfy regulatory capital requirements, it raised $89 million in an IPO, ending four generations of control by the Williams family.

In 2018 the bank won a court case following its attempt to stop a hedge fund placing its own candidates on the board.

It was announced in November 2018 that HomeStreet Bank would acquire the San Marcos, California retail branch and business lending team of Silvergate Bank. The transaction was expected to be finalized in the first half of 2019.

On March 24, 2020, HomeStreet suspended its $27 million stock buyback plan during the COVID-19 pandemic.

Sponsorships 

 Seattle Seahawks
 Miss Madison, an H1 Unlimited hydroplane
 Seafair

References

American companies established in 1921
Banks established in 1921
Banks based in Washington (state)
Companies based in Seattle
Companies listed on the Nasdaq